Tamara St. John is an American politician and a Republican member of the South Dakota House of Representatives representing District 1 since January 8, 2019. With her election, St. John became the first and only Native American Republican woman to ever serve in the South Dakota House of Representatives.

Early life and education 
Tamara Jill St. John was born to Karen Brown (Keeble) and Phillip St. John on July 28, 1966 in Sisseton, South Dakota. She is an enrolled member of the Sisseton Wahpeton Sioux Tribe of the Lake Traverse Reservation. She attended Sisseton Public School and has a certificate in cultural heritage tourism from George Washington University.

Private life 
Tamara St. John has four adult children and two grandchildren. She currently resides in Sisseton, South Dakota.

Career 
St. John works as an historian, genealogist and has spent many years in the area of historic preservation, along with currently serving as the archivist for the Sisseton Wahpeton Tribal Archives and Collections. In this role, she specializes in community outreach and education. St. John has also worked with local, state and federal governments on issues involving historic preservation, cultural projects, and government consultations.

St. John served on the South Dakota Humanities Council as a member of the board of directors from 2016 to 2021. She also served as a delegate for the Her Vote. Her Voice. project to help South Dakota commemorate the 100th anniversary of the Women’s Suffrage Movement.

Political career 
When incumbent Jason Frerichs was term-limited in the State Senate, Susan Wismer ran unopposed for the Senate seat, vacating her House seat. Tamara St. John was the only Republican candidate to run in District 1, challenging former legislators Steven D. McCleerey and H. Paul Dennert in a three-way race for the two House seats. On November 6, 2018, she won her first election, coming in first place with 4,735 votes (36%) to Steven D. McCleerey’s 4,300 votes (33%). H. Paul Dennert finished with 4,139 votes (31%). She was the first Republican candidate on the ballot for District 1 in 10 years, and the first Republican candidate to win a legislative seat in District 1 in over 20 years.

She won her second House term on November 3, 2020 after coming in first place in a three-way general election, securing 6,150 votes (41%) of the votes cast.

St. John serves on the House Judiciary Committee, House Health and Human Services Committee and Co-chairs the State-Tribal Relations Committee.

In the 2022 Legislative session, St. John brought legislation (HB 1196) to designate the traditional flute as the official indigenous instrument in South Dakota, which was signed into law by Gov. Kristi Noem.

References

1966 births
Living people
Republican Party members of the South Dakota House of Representatives
Native American state legislators in South Dakota
People from Sisseton, South Dakota
21st-century American politicians
21st-century American women politicians
21st-century Native Americans
Women state legislators in South Dakota
21st-century Native American women
Sisseton Wahpeton Oyate people